The aggravation of the class struggle along with the development of socialism is a component of the theory of Stalinism.

The theory was one of the cornerstones of Stalinism in the internal politics of the Soviet Union. Although the term class struggle was introduced by Karl Marx and Friedrich Engels and the aggravation of the class struggle was an expression originally coined by Vladimir Lenin in 1919 to refer to the dictatorship of the proletariat, the theory itself was put forward by Joseph Stalin in 1929 and supplied a theoretical base for the claim that ongoing repression of capitalist elements is necessary. Stalin believed that residual bourgeois elements would persist within the country and that with support from Western powers they would try to infiltrate the party.

A variation of the theory was also adopted by Mao Zedong in China.

Exposition and origin 
Vladimir Lenin believed that the Russian Civil War represented the peak of the aggravation of class struggle which found its representation in the Soviet dictatorship of the proletariat and that by war's end and the victorious establishment of a workers' state in Russia the bourgeois class was effectively rooted out and therefore the theory no longer applied in that country. On the other hand, Joseph Stalin argued that the further the country moved forward in constructing socialism, the more acute the forms of struggle that would be used by the doomed remnants of exploiter classes in their last desperate efforts. Therefore political repression was necessary to prevent them from succeeding in their presumed goal of destroying the Soviet Union.

Stalin put forth this theory in 1929 in the special section of his speech "The Right Deviation in the C.P.S.U.(B.)" at the plenum of the Central Committee and Central Control Commission, C.P.S.U.(B.) held 16–23 April 1929, which concluded:
The dying classes are resisting, not because they have become stronger than we are, but because socialism is growing faster than they are, and they are becoming weaker than we are. And precisely because they are becoming weaker, they feel that their last days are approaching and are compelled to resist with all the forces and all the means in their power.

Such is the mechanics of the intensification of the class struggle and of the resistance of the capitalists at the present moment of history.

Stalin believed that the class enemy could even worm its way into the Bolshevik Party claiming to lead a socialist state. He evaluated his associates of the day based on whether they acted on that belief or the belief that a party could have no enemies inside it. Tolerance inside the party to those who disagreed with the official party line was called "rotten liberalism" by Stalin. He believed such tolerance would make the party weak and eventually lead to its destruction. As a result, he argued that purges were sometimes necessary.

The notion of the aggravation of class struggle under socialism stands in contrast to the ideas of other communists such as Nikolai Bukharin (against whom Stalin argued in the 1929 speech) or Leon Trotsky, who argued that there was no longer any bourgeoisie in the Soviet Union to have to struggle with and that the very definition of socialism implies there are no longer antagonistic classes in struggle.

Maoism 

This theory is similar to Mao Zedong's slogan "Never forget class struggle!" once plastered all over the walls in China. Mao developed Stalin's idea further, saying that there is the possibility of an entire bourgeoisie developing inside the communist party leading a socialist state before the establishment of communism. Mao stressed the supposedly domestic roots of that bourgeoisie while Stalin focused more on presumed Western spies. According to Mao, the bourgeoisie inside the party aimed at the restoration of capitalism. Mao also held that peaceful evolution was the goal of the foreign capitalists and that the restoration of capitalism could happen from within without war, if there were an ebb in the class struggle.

Upon coming to power, Deng Xiaoping rejected Mao's theory of the bourgeoisie in the party and as a result introduced the socialist market economy, justified by the theory of a primary stage of socialism.

Criticism 
Martemyan Ryutin, a staunch opponent of Stalin, eventually executed in 1937, argued in his manuscript "Stalin and the Crisis of the Proletarian Dictatorship", secretly circulated and known as the Ryutin Platform, that this theory is a merely declarative one, without any analysis in its support. In particular, Stalin's claim, in fact the only cornerstone of the theory, that not a single class defeated in a revolution known to cease its struggle, is ungrounded. Stalin gave not a single example of this and in fact the opposite was true in bourgeois revolutions. Ryutin concludes that this theory serves for the "justification of the civil war against the principal masses in the countryside".

Nikita Khrushchev in his Secret Speech at the 20th Congress of the CPSU in 1956 argued that it was "a theoretical justification of the mass terror policy".

Historian Timothy Snyder has argued that the theory served the Stalinist regime both as self-justification for the failures of its policies of collectivization (which were to be blamed on saboteurs rather than on the implementation of the programme) and as an ideological tool for the continuation of mass repression:

Similarly, György Lukács criticized the theory in 1968 as non-Marxist and as a vehicle to serve Stalin's tactical maneuvers:

See also 
 Cult of personality
 Cultural Revolution
 Maoism
 Socialism in one country
 Stalinism

References 

Ideology of the Communist Party of the Soviet Union
Maoism
Marxism–Leninism
Political repression in the Soviet Union
Political repression in China
Joseph Stalin
Soviet internal politics
Stalinism